Sawdust is a 1923 American silent drama film directed by Jack Conway and starring Gladys Walton, Niles Welch, and Herbert Standing.

Cast
 Gladys Walton as Nita Moore 
 Niles Welch as Phillip Lessoway 
 Edith Murgatroyd as Mrs. Nancy Wentworth 
 Herbert Standing as Ethelbert Wentworth 
 Matthew Betz as Runner Bayne 
 Frank Brownlee as 'Pop' Gifford 
 William Robert Daly as 'Speck' Dawson 
 Mattie Peters as Tressie

References

Bibliography
 James Robert Parish & Michael R. Pitts. Film directors: a guide to their American films. Scarecrow Press, 1974.

External links

1923 films
1923 drama films
1920s English-language films
American silent feature films
Silent American drama films
Films directed by Jack Conway
American black-and-white films
Universal Pictures films
1920s American films